Charles Wyndford Parsons FRSE (1901-1950) was a 20th-century British zoologist.

Life
He was born in Swansea on 22 July 1901. He was educated at Bristol Grammar School then studied Zoology at Cambridge University graduating MA in 1924. He then began lecturing in Zoology at Glasgow University.

In 1933 he was elected a Fellow of the Royal Society of Edinburgh. His proposers were Sir John Graham Kerr, Robert Staig, James Chumley and John Walton.

He died suddenly on 26 August 1950 aged only 49.

References

1901 births
1950 deaths
Scientists from Swansea
Alumni of the University of Cambridge
20th-century British zoologists
Academics of the University of Glasgow
Fellows of the Royal Society of Edinburgh